Hamba is a genus of achilid planthoppers in the family Achilidae. There are at least four described species in Hamba.

Species
These four species belong to the genus Hamba:
 Hamba bisulca Chen, Yang & Wilson, 1989 c g
 Hamba inclinata (Walker, 1857) c g
 Hamba perplexa (Walker, 1857) c g
 Hamba seleucus Fennah, 1978 c g
Data sources: i = ITIS, c = Catalogue of Life, g = GBIF, b = Bugguide.net

References

Further reading

 
 
 
 
 

Achilidae
Auchenorrhyncha genera